Min Yoon-gi (born March 9, 1993), known professionally by his stage names Suga (stylized in all caps) and Agust D, is a South Korean rapper, songwriter and record producer. Under Big Hit Music, he debuted as a member of the South Korean boy band BTS in 2013. His first solo mixtape, Agust D, was released in 2016 and re-released in 2018 to digital download and streaming platforms, reaching number three on Billboards World Albums Chart. In 2020, he released his second solo mixtape, D-2; it peaked at number 11 on the US Billboard 200, number seven on the UK Albums Chart, and number two on Australia's ARIA Album Chart. According to the Korea Music Copyright Association, Suga has songwriting and production credits on over 100 songs, including Suran's "Wine", which peaked at number two on the Gaon Music Chart and won Best R&B at the 2017 Melon Music Awards.

Early life and education 
Min Yoon-gi was born on March 9, 1993, in Daegu, South Korea. The younger of two sons, he attended Taejeon Elementary School, Gwaneum Middle School, and Apgujeong High School.

In March 2019, after graduating from the Global Cyber University with a degree in Broadcasting and Entertainment, he enrolled at Hanyang Cyber University for the Master of Business Administration program in Advertising and Media.

Career

1993–2010: Beginnings 
Suga became interested in rap after hearing "Ragga Muffin" by Stony Skunk, stating that it was different from anything he had ever heard before. After hearing Epik High, he decided to become a rapper.

By age 13, he began to write music lyrics and learned about MIDI. He worked a part-time job at a record studio by age 17. From then on, he began composing and arranging music, rapping, and performing. Before being signed, he was active under the name Gloss as an underground rapper. As part of the hip hop crew D-Town in 2010, he produced "518-062", a song commemorating the Gwangju Uprising.

2013–present: BTS 

Originally joining the company as a music producer, Suga trained under Big Hit Entertainment for three years alongside members J-Hope and RM. He made his debut as a member of BTS on Mnet's M Countdown with the track "No More Dream" from their debut single album 2 Cool 4 Skool. He has produced and written lyrics for a variety of tracks on all of BTS' albums.

For BTS' third Korean-language extended play (EP) The Most Beautiful Moment in Life, Pt. 1, Suga released a solo introductory track titled "Intro: The Most Beautiful Moment in Life". Its lyrics itself discussed the fears of reaching adulthood at the end of one's adolescent years. It was released on April 17, 2015 with an animated music video. Pt. 1's follow up EP, The Most Beautiful Moment in Life, Pt. 2, featured another introduction performed by Suga, called "Intro: Never Mind", specifically recounting Suga's teenage years. The song released on November 15, 2015, the first song on BTS' 2016 compilation album The Most Beautiful Moment in Life: Young Forever. Suga did not perform another introductory track for BTS until 2020, when he released "Interlude: Shadow" as part of the Map of the Soul: 7 album. The interlude is a rap song that references "Intro: O!RUL8,2?" from the 2013 EP of the same name and discusses BTS' fame, comparing its reality to the celebrity about which O!RUL8,2? dreamed. The song was released on January 10, along with a music video referencing the struggles of fame. Tamar Herman of Billboard described it as an "evocative, yet brash track" and noted how the song's sound changes midway through to show "this dichotomy between the relationship of how fame and audiences watching him affects his idea of self".

Suga also released two solo tracks under the group's name. The first, a song titled "First Love", appeared on BTS' 2016 studio album Wings. It is an autobiographical rap track reminiscent of a monologue. On the 2018 compilation album Love Yourself: Answer, Suga released the song "Trivia: Seesaw", which discussed the up-and-down nature of falling in love. That same year, Suga was awarded the fifth-class Hwagwan Order of Cultural Merit as a member of BTS by the President of South Korea, along with other members of the group.

In July 2021, he was appointed Special Presidential Envoy for Future Generations and Culture by President Moon Jae-in, along with the other members of BTS, to help "lead the global agenda for future generations" and "expand South Korea's diplomatic efforts and global standing" in the international community.

2016–present: Solo career 
Suga released a free self-titled mixtape via SoundCloud on August 15, 2016. He decided against releasing the project as a commercial studio album, describing it as the "feeling of being trapped in some sort of framework." On the record, he discussed matters such as his struggles with depression and social phobia. Fuse TV rated it one of the top 20 mixtapes of 2016. The following year, in 2017, Suga composed the song "Wine" for singer Suran, with whom he had previously worked on a single on his mixtape. At Suga's studio, Suran heard a rough draft of "Wine" and asked Suga for the song. The record peaked at number two on the Gaon Digital Chart in South Korea and won the Best R&B genre award at the Melon Music Awards on December 2, 2017. Suga also received the Hot Trend Award for his work on the track. Suga later re-released his first mixtape to digital download and streaming platforms in February 2018. The reissue reached number three on Billboards World Albums Chart, number five on the Heatseekers Albums chart, and number 74 on the Top Album Sales chart in the United States. Suga, as Agust D, reached number 46 on the Emerging Artists chart for the week of March 3.

In January 2019, Suga provided a rap feature on Lee So-ra's single "Song Request". The track was co-written by Suga and Tablo of Epik High, who also produced the track. The single debuted at number three on the Gaon Digital Chart and at number two on Billboard's World Digital Song Sales chart, with 3,000 downloads during the song's two-day charting period. Suga later produced a track for Epik High's Sleepless in extended play, titled "Eternal Sunshine", in February. He co-wrote and produced the digital single "We Don't Talk Together" for singer Heize, which she released on July 7. In December, American singer-songwriter Halsey released the song "Suga's Interlude", from her third studio album Manic, which both featured and was produced by Suga.

On May 6, 2020, IU released the digital single "Eight" featuring and produced by Suga. The song debuted at number one on both the Gaon Digital Chart and the World Digital Song Sales chart. Suga released his second mixtape, D-2 (the continuation to Agust D), together with the music video for its lead single "Daechwita" on May 22, which peaked at number 76 on the US Billboard Hot 100 chart. The mixtape debuted at number 11 on the Billboard 200 and became the highest-charting album by a Korean soloist in the US at the time. It also became the first Korean solo release to reach the top 10 in the United Kingdom, opening at number seven on the UK Albums Chart.

In 2021, Suga re-composed Samsung's signature ringtone, "Over The Horizon". The track was unveiled on August 11 as part of Samsung's "Unpacked 2021" event. He later produced the single "You" for Japanese singer ØMI, which was released on October 15. In December, Suga featured on the single "Girl of My Dreams" from American rapper Juice Wrld's posthumous album Fighting Demons. The single debuted at number 29 on the Billboard Hot 100, earning Suga his second entry on the chart as a solo artist. He next co-wrote, produced, and featured on the song "That That" for Psy, which was released on April 29, 2022, as the lead single from the singer's eighth studio album Psy 9th. Suga was announced as a brand ambassador for Valentino and the face of the Maison Valentino Essentials campaign for the brand's menswear staples in January 2023. He will embark on his first official solo tour in April and visit cities in the US, Indonesia, Thailand, Singapore, South Korea, and Japan.

Name 

The stage name Suga is derived from the first syllables of the term shooting guard, the position he played in basketball as a student. He adopted the alias Agust D in 2016 for his mixtape, which is derived from the initials DT for his birthplace, Daegu Town, and "Suga", spelled backwards.

Artistry 
Suga writes, composes, arranges, mixes, and masters his own material. Over 100 registered songs are credited to him by the Korea Music Copyright Association. He plays piano and produces mainly hip hop and R&B music. His lyrics involve themes that are "full of dreams and hope," conceived with the intent of his music becoming "many people's strength." He cites Stony Skunk and Epik High as his inspirations to pursue hip hop music. Particularly, he credits the former's reggae-hip hop hybrid album Ragga Muffin (2005) and its title track for igniting his interest in the genre.

Jeff Benjamin of Fuse said that Suga's mixtape "showcases the star's ear for hot productions, hardcore rap style, and how he can make his vulnerabilities a strength." Other critics stated that Suga's "storytelling execution in the music he creates tears down the barrier of censoring and sugarcoating".

In January 2018, Suga was promoted to a full member of the Korea Music Copyright Association.

Reception 
In 2017, Suga was ranked the 13th most preferred idol of the year in a survey conducted by Gallup Korea. He ranked seventh in 2018 and ninth in 2019.

Personal life 
In 2018, he purchased a US$3 million apartment located in South Korea and as of 2019, he lives in Hannam-dong, Seoul, South Korea.

Health 
Suga was diagnosed with appendicitis, and underwent surgery at Severance Hospital in Sinchon on December 9, 2013. He was discharged on the December 17 but was re-hospitalized on December 26 due to inflammation of the surgical site. Consequently, he was unable to attend year-end music festivals.

In December 2016, Suga suffered an ear injury after tripping over a door threshold. Following doctor recommendations, he took a one-week break from performing and participating in choreography (including at year-end festivals) to ensure the wound healed properly.

In November 2020, Suga underwent surgery to repair a torn labrum (reverse Bankart tear) in his left shoulder and announced that he would be taking a break from subsequent promotional activities in order to fully recover. He resumed activities in January 2021, beginning with a performance with BTS at the 35th Golden Disc Awards.

Philanthropy and activism
In 2014, Suga promised to buy his fans meat should he find success as a musical artist. Four years later, on his 25th birthday, he donated beef to 39 orphanages in the name of "ARMY", BTS' fanbase. In 2019, for his 26th birthday, he donated KR₩100 million (US$88,000) and 329 BT21 Shooky dolls to the Korea Pediatric Cancer Foundation. On February 27, 2020, Suga donated ₩100 million to the Hope Bridge National Disaster Relief Association to help prevention and relief efforts in his hometown of Daegu, one of the cities most affected by the coronavirus outbreak in South Korea at the time. On March 9, 2021, he donated ₩100 million to Daegu's Keimyung University Dongsan Hospital to support child cancer patients who cannot access treatment due to financial difficulties. On March 9, 2022, in celebration of his 29th birthday, Suga donated ₩100 million to the Hope Bridge Disaster Relief Association to help the victims of the massive wildfires along the country's eastern coastal area.
On March 9, 2023, he donated ₩100 million to the Korean Save the Children, which will be used to
purchase blankets, mattresses and school supplies for children needed in southern Turkey and northern Syria.

Suga has spoken openly about mental health and supported equality for the LGBTQ+ community.

Discography

Mixtapes

Charted songs

Other songs

As producer

Filmography

Music videos

Trailers and short films

Web shows

Awards and nominations

Notes

References

External links 

1993 births
Living people
People from Daegu
South Korean male rappers
South Korean record producers
South Korean hip hop record producers
South Korean singer-songwriters
South Korean male singer-songwriters
South Korean male idols
BTS members
Japanese-language singers of South Korea
English-language singers from South Korea
21st-century South Korean musicians
Recipients of the Order of Cultural Merit (Korea)
Hybe Corporation artists